Joseph H. Hazelton (c. 1853 – October 6, 1936), aka Joseph Hazleton, was an American stage and film actor. He appeared in 30 films between 1912 and 1922. As a boy program giver at Ford's Theatre, he witnessed the assassination of U.S. President Abraham Lincoln on April 14, 1865.

Life and career
Hazelton debuted on stage as a child when a production at Grover's Theater in Washington, D.C. needed a boy to play a young prince in King John. Thereafter, he continued to stay around the theater, doing odd jobs and handing out programs. In 1910, he was a member of the Columbia Players in Washington, D.C.

When the Pasadena Community Playhouse presented Our American Cousin in 1930, Hazelton spoke during intermission of each performance, relating what he witnessed as he observed the assassination. In 1933, Hazelton gave a lecture at May Company Exposition Hall in Los Angeles and talked about watching Booth shoot Lincoln. An article in Good Housekeeping in its February 1927 edition, titled "This Man Saw Lincoln Shot," was the basis for a leaflet that Hazleton released to raise funds later in his life.

On Broadway, Hazelton performed in Skipper & Co., Wall Street (1903).

Hazelton died in Los Angeles, California on October 6, 1936.

Selected filmography

See also
Samuel J. Seymour, last living witness of Lincoln's assassination

References

External links

Joseph Hazleton recalls witnessing Lincoln assassination as a boy
 audio recording of Hazelton recalling the Lincoln assassination

1850s births
1936 deaths
American male film actors
American male silent film actors
20th-century American male actors
People associated with the assassination of Abraham Lincoln